Partly Plugged is an album by the American Southern rock band Atlanta Rhythm Section, released in 1997. (See 1997 in music)

Track listing
"Voodoo" (Buie, Hammond) – 3:57
"She Knows All My Tricks" (Buie, Cobb, Hammond) – 4:03
"I Don't Want to Grow Old Alone" (Buie, Hammond) – 2:52
"Child of the Video Age" (Buie, Hammond) – 3:40
"Alien" (Buie, Lewis, McRay) – 5:16
"So into You" (Buie, Daughtry, Nix) – 6:10
"Imaginary Lover" (Buie, Daughtry, Nix) – 5:34
"I'm Not Gonna Let It Bother Me Tonight" (Buie, Daughtry, Nix) – 4:25
"Angel (What in the World's Come Over Us)" (Bailey, Buie, Nix) – 5:41
"Do It or Die" (Buie, Cobb, Hammond) – 3:40

Personnel
Barry Bailey - guitar
Dean Daughtry - keyboards
Ronnie Hammond vocals, backing vocals
Angie Harrison - backing vocals
Justin Senker - bass guitar
Jan Smith - backing vocals
Steve "Clean" Stone - rhythm guitar, slide guitar
R.J. Vealey - percussion, drums

Production
Producer: Buddy Buie
Engineer: Rodney Mills
Assistant engineer: Steven Rhodes
Mixing: Rodney Mills
Mixing assistant: Steven Rhodes
Mastering: Rodney Mills
Art direction: Mike McCarty
Design: Mike McCarty
Photography: Rick Diamond
Artwork: Garey Goss
Technical staff: Terry Spackman

Atlanta Rhythm Section albums
1997 albums
Albums produced by Buddy Buie